"Uncle Pat" is a song by Ash, released as the third single from their album Trailer, released on 17 October 1994. It was released as a single CD and a 7" vinyl. It peaked at #101 in the UK.

The B-side "Different Today" first appeared on the "Shed" demo tape, and also features on the US release of "Trailer".

The song was also used on a Heineken advert.

Track listing 
"Uncle Pat" (Wheeler)
"Different Today" (Wheeler)
"Hulk Hogan Bubblebath" (Ash)

References
 http://walking-barefoot.com

1994 singles
Ash (band) songs
Songs written by Tim Wheeler
1994 songs
Infectious Records singles